Marco van den Berg (born 4 June 1965) is a Dutch basketball coach and former player. He was most recently head coach of Gladiators Trier.

Professional career
Born in Veenendaal, van den Berg played for Donar and Red Giants, both of the Eredivisie, in his career.

Coaching career
In 1990, van den Berg started his coaching career.

In 2015, van den Berg was appointed as head coach of Gladiators Trier in Germany. He coached there for three seasons before leaving to coach the Orange Lions Academy program. In April 2020, he signed again with the Gladiators until 2023.

References

Living people
1965 births
Donar (basketball club) coaches
Donar (basketball club) players
Dutch basketball coaches
Dutch Basketball League coaches
Dutch Basketball League players
Landstede Hammers coaches
Matrixx Magixx coaches
Medi Bayreuth coaches
People from Veenendaal
Red Giants (basketball club) players
Sportspeople from Utrecht (province)
Dutch expatriate sportspeople in Germany